Alessandro Camon (born 7 June 1963) is an Academy Award nominated screenwriter and film producer.

Life and career
Born in Padua, Italy, he currently lives in Los Angeles. Camon is a graduate of the University of Padua, School of Philosophy, and received a masters in film from UCLA in Los Angeles.

Camon wrote The Messenger with writer/director Oren Moverman. The film won the Silver Bear for best screenplay and the Peace Film Award at the Berlin International Film Festival, as well as the Grand Prize and the International Critics Prize at the Deauville Film Festival. It was nominated in the Best Original Screenplay and Best Supporting Actor categories by the Academy of Motion Picture Arts and Sciences.

Camon's producing credits include The Cooler, Thank You For Smoking,  Owning Mahowny  Bad Lieutenant: Port of Call New Orleans and Wall Street 2: Money Never Sleeps.

Camon started his career in Italy as a film critic. He has written several books and articles on film, both in Italian and English. His stage play Time Alone premiered in Los Angeles in September 2017, starring Tonya Pinkins and Alex Hernandez. It received the award for outstanding new play from the Los Angeles Drama Critics Circle. 

Camon is the son of novelist Ferdinando Camon and newspaper columnist Gabriella Imperatori and is married to film producer Suzanne Warren (The Last King of Scotland, Hacksaw Ridge).

References

External links

 https://web.archive.org/web/20110607013431/http://dir.salon.com/story/ent/feature/2005/03/08/mafia/
 https://web.archive.org/web/20080707084141/http://dir.salon.com/story/opinion/feature/2005/10/07/jesus/
 https://web.archive.org/web/20090302081946/http://dir.salon.com/story/opinion/feature/2004/06/07/torture/index.html
 https://web.archive.org/web/20090124092045/http://www.nyoffice.net/talent/writers/Camon.Alessandro_resume.html
 https://web.archive.org/web/20091209031044/http://www.themessengermovie.com/
 https://lareviewofbooks.org/contributor/alessandro-camon/
 http://www.salon.com/writer/alessandro_camon/
 https://web.archive.org/web/20161112081310/https://www.adbusters.org/article/call-of-duty/
 http://www.hollywoodreporter.com/review/time-alone-theater-1046865
 http://www.latimes.com/entertainment/arts/la-ca-cm-tonya-pinkins-20171018-story.html
 http://www.univision.com/los-angeles/kmex/noticias/criminalidad-y-justicia/tiempo-a-solas-lo-que-la-violencia-y-la-justicia-les-dejo-a-una-madre-y-a-un-pandillero
 http://www.theatermania.com/los-angeles-theater/news/first-person-alessandro-camon-on-time-alone_82678.htm
 http://www.latimes.com/local/california/la-me-lopez-theater-students-20180317-story.html

1963 births
Living people
American male screenwriters
Italian film producers
Italian male writers
Film people from Padua
University of Padua alumni
UCLA Film School alumni
Silver Bear for Best Screenplay winners